Barringtonia havilandii is a tree of the Lecythidaceae family endemic to Borneo. Its habitat is inland riverine forests.

References

havilandii
Plants described in 1938
Endemic flora of Borneo
Trees of Borneo
Flora of the Borneo lowland rain forests